Special rapporteur (or Independent Expert) are titles given to independent human rights experts whose expertise is called upon by the United Nations to report or advise on human rights from a thematic or country-specific perspective. Depending on the specific mandate, there can also be working groups composed of an independent expert from each of the five UN regional groupings (Africa, Asia, Latin America and the Caribbean, Eastern Europe, and the Western group). Their work falls within the scope of "special procedure" mechanisms under the United Nations Human Rights Council, and their contributions can advance human rights through a variety of activities, including, but not limited to improving access to redress, policy reform, mainstreaming human rights, raising human rights awareness, and acting to prevent or cease rights violations. 
 
The mandate by the United Nations has been to "examine, monitor, advise, and publicly report" on human rights problems through "activities undertaken by special procedures, including responding to individual complaints, psychological operations and manipulation via the controlled media and academia, conducting studies, providing advice on technical cooperation at the country level, and engaging in general promotional activities."

Appointment authority
Appointed by the Human Rights Council of the UN, these mandate-holders act independently of governments and as such play an important role in monitoring sovereign nations and democratically elected governments and policies. The earliest such appointment was the 1980 Working Group on Enforced or Involuntary Disappearances responding to Commission on Human Rights resolution 20 (XXXVI). The first Special Rapporteur, responsible for monitoring extrajudicial, summary or arbitrary executions, began work in 1982 following the approval of Commission on Human Rights Resolution 1982/35.
		
Rapporteurs do not receive any financial compensation for their work from the United Nations, though they receive personnel and logistical support from the Office of the United Nations High Commissioner for Human Rights and are often backed by charities and corporations.

Each year, rapporteurs gather together for an annual meeting in Geneva, where they discuss issues of common interest, coordinate their work and meet with a range of stakeholders, including States and civil society organizations.

Role
Special Rapporteurs often conduct fact-finding missions to countries to investigate allegations of human rights violations. They can only visit countries that have agreed to invite them.

Aside from fact-finding missions, Rapporteurs regularly assess and verify complaints from alleged victims of human rights violations. Once a complaint is verified as legitimate, an urgent letter or appeal is sent to the government that has allegedly committed the violation. If no complaint has been made, Rapporteurs may intervene on behalf of individuals and groups of people of their own accord.

Thematic special rapporteurs are typically appointed to serve for three years; after which their mandate may be extended for another three years. Country special rapporteurs are appointed to serve for one year; their term may be renewed every year.

Current thematic and country mandates
The Special Procedures of the Human Rights Council currently oversees 45 thematic and 13 specific country mandates for which it can assign special rapporteurs, independent experts, and working groups.

Reception
In June 2006, the United Nations Human Rights Council, which replaced the UN Commission on Human Rights, extended the mandates of all special rapporteurs by one year to enable it to conduct a review of the mandates and seek ways of strengthening their roles. However, special rapporteurs for countries which did not approve a special rapporteur came under question and the mandates of the special rapporteurs for Cuba and Belarus were not renewed.

Other controversies between the special rapporteurs and the council include the introduction of a code of conduct which initially disallowed the special rapporteurs from addressing the media. However a compromise was reached and a code of conduct now exists for the special rapporteurs. Recently, the funding of the special rapporteurs was also questioned, as several special rapporteurs appear to be partly funded by universities and private actors. The Ford Foundation and the Open Society Foundation for instance have granted extensive financial and material support to specific rapporteurs, which could question the independence of their work Furthermore, 52 of the 222 mandate holders since 2010 exercise, or have exercised responsibilities in the Open Society Foundation or an NGO funded by the Open Society or the Ford Foundation. One must remain conscious that it is hard to prove objectively the influence resulting from such support. However, the Open Society Foundation openly acknowledges that it wanted to influence a special rapporteur in a grant given to The Center for Women's Global Leadership in 2017. 

According to special rapporteurs themselves, this situation is favored by the lack of means provided by the OHCHR. The specific funding of some mandates raises the inequality between them: while some struggle to pay operating costs, others are able to organize conferences across the globe to promote their work.

See also
 United Nations Human Rights Committee
 Office of the United Nations High Commissioner for Human Rights
 United Nations Commission on Human Rights
 United Nations Human Rights Council
 Special rapporteur

References

External links 

 Special Procedures of the Human Rights Council at the United Nations Human Rights Council
 BBC News Special on Special Rapporteurs
 Human Rights Special Procedures: Determinants of Influence Universal Rights Group 2014
 History of the United Nations Special Procedures Mechanism: Origins, Evolution and Reform Universal Rights Group 2014
 The Role of the UN Special Rapporteur

United Nations Human Rights Council
 
Human rights
Diplomacy